All About Faces was a weekly game show which ran from August 30, 1971, to September 1972. The series incorporated a "hidden camera" format similar to Candid Camera. The program was produced in Toronto by Screen Gems, at the studios of CFTO-TV in Scarborough, Toronto, Ontario. Richard Hayes was host, and the show's producer was Dan Enright. The show was short-lived, lasting only one season in U.S. television syndication and on Canada's CTV.

Format
Two teams, each consisting of a celebrity and a friend or relative, would be shown a clip of an unsuspecting person placed in an embarrassing situation, recorded by a hidden camera, and as the film was frozen on a closeup of the person's face, the contestants had to wager on how the person would react. For example, a person in a taxicab is told by the driver that he is nearsighted and color blind; the contestants would guess whether the passenger would exit the cab or not. Each team started with $50 and could bet up to that amount in each round; the team with the most money after four rounds won the game, with their winnings donated to their favorite charity.

Broadcast history
This was one of several Canadian game shows Dan Enright worked on following his post-quiz show scandals exile; he would later make a comeback to American game shows when former partner Jack Barry brought him in to produce the final network season of Barry's own successful comeback series, The Joker's Wild.

The format of guessing the outcome of a "hidden camera" video would subsequently be reused in two later game shows, Anything for Money and Hold Everything!.

External links
 All About Faces on IMDb

1971 Canadian television series debuts
1972 Canadian television series endings
1970s Canadian reality television series
Television series by Sony Pictures Television
CTV Television Network original programming
1970s Canadian game shows
Television series by Screen Gems
Television series by Bell Media
Television shows filmed in Toronto